Savat is a neighbourhood in the Lice District of Diyarbakır Province in Turkey.

Notable people 

 Ehmedê Xasî

References

Villages in Lice District
All stub articles